Xiphulcus is a genus of parasitoid wasps belonging to the family Ichneumonidae.

The species of this genus are found in Europe.

Species:
 Xiphulcus additor Aubert, 1977 
 Xiphulcus constrictus (Thomson, 1884)

References

Ichneumonidae
Ichneumonidae genera